Eoon Qi Xuan (born 2 November 2000) is a Malaysian badminton player. She graduated from the Bukit Jalil Sports School and was promoted to the national senior squad in January 2019. She was the girls' singles bronze medalist at the 2017 Asian Junior Championships, and was part of the junior team that won the bronze medal in 2017, 2018 Asian and a silver at the 2017 World Junior Championships. She was the member of Malaysian national women's team who won the bronze medal at the 2019 Southeast Asian Games and 2020 Asia Team Championships. She was also part of the national mixed team that won bronze at the 2021 Sudirman Cup.

Achievements

Asian Junior Championships 
Girls' singles

BWF International Challenge/Series (1 runner-up) 
Women's singles

  BWF International Challenge tournament
  BWF International Series tournament
  BWF Future Series tournament

References

External links 

Living people
2000 births
People from Perak
Malaysian female badminton players
Malaysian sportspeople of Chinese descent
Competitors at the 2019 Southeast Asian Games
Southeast Asian Games bronze medalists for Malaysia
Southeast Asian Games medalists in badminton
21st-century Malaysian women